First Love is the debut extended play by South Korean girl group CLC. It was released on March 19, 2015 by Cube Entertainment. "Pepe" was released as the lead single.

Background
In March 2015, CUBE Entertainment launched the multi-national girl group CLC including original members Seunghee, Yujin, Seungyeon, Sorn and Yeeun. The group held their debut showcase on March 18 at the AX Hall in Gwangjang-dong, Seoul, performing tracks from their debut album. The group made their official debut on March 19 at Mnet's M Countdown performing with the tracks "First Love" and their promotional single, "Pepe". They also released the mini-album and music video for "Pepe" on the same day.

The album "First Love" has a total of five tracks. Duble Sidekick, Seo Jaewoo, Playing Kid, Yanggang, and BTOB's Jung Il-hoon participated in the creation of album as producers and lyricist. The album aims to represent CLC's undeniable charms. The point choreography of the song was created by Rain. At their debut showcase, the members revealed that all the proceeds of the album will be donated to children with developmental disabilities.

In 2016, CLC released a Mandarin version of their song, "First Love" (Chinese title: 初恋), for the Chinese drama, The Best Meeting (native title: 最好的遇见).

Track listing

Charts

References

External links

CLC (group) EPs
Cube Entertainment EPs
Dance-pop EPs
2015 debut EPs
Korean-language EPs